Jean-Pierre Jacques Jarier (born 10 July 1946) is a French former Grand Prix racing driver. He drove for Formula One teams including Shadow, Team Lotus, Ligier, Osella and Tyrrell Racing. His best finish was third (three times) and he also took three pole positions.

Early career
Jarier was born at Charenton-le-Pont, near Paris. After competing in Formula France, he moved up to French Formula Three, finishing 3rd overall in 1970, before moving on to the Shell Arnold European Formula Two team in 1971. He peaked with two 3rd places, and also made his Grand Prix debut at Monza when the team rented a March Engineering 701. However, the team dropped him midway through 1972 for financial reasons. For 1973 he signed to the March Engineering Formula Two team, and was also given a Formula One seat by the outfit. Formula One was difficult in the uncompetitive 721G, but Jarier stormed to the Formula Two title with eight wins.

Formula One

After his good form in the 1973 F2 European series, Jarier nearly signed for Ferrari, but their established driver Clay Regazzoni insisted on having the young Austrian Niki Lauda as his teammate.  In 1974 Jarier drove a full season of Formula One, signing with the Shadow Racing Cars team. He became team leader following the death of Peter Revson, and finished 3rd at the Monaco Grand Prix on his way to 14th overall. As a sports car driver. Jarier led Matra's successful defense of its world sports car title, and proved himself the fastest driver of all on the classic road circuits, being faster than Ickx at Nürburgring and the old Spa road circuit and winning three other rounds on GP circuits at Brands Hatch, Watkins Glen and Paul Ricard.

1975 began Jarier putting his Shadow DN5 on pole position for the Argentine Grand Prix, only for a component to break in the warm-up, preventing Jarier from taking the start. He repeated the feat at the Brazilian Grand Prix, and then dominated the race until a fuel metering unit failed, ending his race. Bad luck and poor reliability would curse his season, though the Shadow team fell from the pace as well. His only points-scoring finish was for 4th place in the shortened Spanish Grand Prix.

Jarier spent 1976 with Shadow Racing Cars, qualifying 3rd in an updated version of the previous year's car, the DN5B and setting fastest lap at the opening Brazilian Grand Prix, before spinning off and crashing on James Hunt's oil whilst running second a few seconds behind Niki Lauda in a Ferrari. Subsequently, the car became uncompetitive, and Jarier failed to score any points.

After this, his career slowed. He switched to the ATS team in 1977, driving a Penske. He scored a point in his first race for the team, and then had one-off drives for Shadow and Équipe Ligier when the German team elected to miss the final races of the year. He also dabbled in sports cars, winning two races in an Alfa Romeo T33 with Arturo Merzario, and coming second at the Le Mans 24 Hours with Vern Schuppan in a Mirage.

His second year at ATS in the in-house HS1, was less successful, and he was fired after an argument with team principal Günter Schmid after failing to qualify the car for the Monaco Grand Prix. He was briefly re-hired for the German Grand Prix, only to miss the grid again, and again argued with Schmidt, leaving once more. However, at the end of the year he was signed by Team Lotus to take the seat left by Ronnie Peterson's death. He set fastest lap at the United States Grand Prix East at Watkins Glen, running 3rd before he ran out of fuel, and then took pole and dominated at the Canadian Grand Prix at Montreal before an oil leak ended his race.

These showings saw him signed by Tyrrell Racing. He was a regular points-scorer over two seasons with the team, with his best results being two 3rd places, achieved at the 1979 South African Grand Prix and the 1979 British Grand Prix.

He began 1981 with a temporary assignment for Ligier, standing in while Jean-Pierre Jabouille returned to fitness, for two races at Long Beach and Rio de Janeiro. He then drove with Osella beginning midway through the season.

1982 saw a full season with Osella, with Jarier securing the team's best-ever finish with 4th at the San Marino Grand Prix (which was boycotted by the majority of British teams). While the rest of the year would be difficult, Jarier was instrumental in keeping the team's morale up following the death of Riccardo Paletti at the Canadian Grand Prix.

The following year saw a full season with Equipe Ligier, but after a good run at Long Beach ended with a collision with Keke Rosberg, he finished the season without points, and spent most of the season making other drivers angry because of his blocking tactics as a back marker. One example of this was the Austrian Grand Prix that year. On lap 22, Ferrari driver Patrick Tambay, who had led the race from the start, was held up by Jarier for two corners (the Glatsch-kurve and the Bosch-kurve). As he was being held up, Tambay's team-mate René Arnoux was able to pass Tambay on the approach to the Texaco-Schikane by boxing Tambay in behind Jarier. This also allowed Brabham driver Nelson Piquet to come from 3rd to 2nd by nipping past Tambay into the second of the two left-handers, which dropped Tambay to 3rd and denied him the lead he had been preparing to re-take from Arnoux. A furious Tambay waved his fist at Jarier when he finally did pass him.

Later life
Following this, Jarier retired from motorsport, but was tempted back to drive in the Porsche Supercup in 1994. This led to several sports car drives, winning the 1998 and 1999 French GT Championships. Jarier contributed major stunt work to the film Ronin, directed by John Frankenheimer, who also directed the 1966 Grand Prix.

Racing record

Career summary

‡ Graded drivers not eligible for European Formula Two Championship points.

Complete European Formula Two Championship results
(key) (Races in bold indicate pole position; races in italics indicate fastest lap)

 Graded drivers not eligible for  European Formula Two Championship points

Complete Formula One World Championship results
(key) (Races in bold indicate pole position, races in italics indicate fastest lap)

 For the 1976 German and Austrian Grands Prix Shadow was sponsored by the Villiger Söhne "Tabatip" cigar brand.

Complete Formula One non-championship results
(key) (Races in bold indicate pole position, races in italics indicate fastest lap)

24 Hours of Le Mans results

References

1946 births
Living people
People from Charenton-le-Pont
French racing drivers
French Formula One drivers
March Formula One drivers
Shadow Formula One drivers
Ligier Formula One drivers
ATS Wheels Formula One drivers
Team Lotus Formula One drivers
Tyrrell Formula One drivers
Osella Formula One drivers
European Formula Two Championship drivers
French Formula Three Championship drivers
24 Hours of Le Mans drivers
24 Hours of Spa drivers
Trans-Am Series drivers
Porsche Supercup drivers
World Sportscar Championship drivers
Sportspeople from Val-de-Marne
BMW M drivers
Larbre Compétition drivers